Potok is a small village on the right bank of the Dreta River in the Municipality of Nazarje in Slovenia. The area belongs to the traditional region of Styria and is now included in the Savinja Statistical Region.

Name
The name of the settlement literally means 'creek, stream'. Mostni graben, a tributary of the Dreta River, flows through the village.

References

External links
Potok on Geopedia

Populated places in the Municipality of Nazarje